The Saint Petersburg State University of Aerospace Instrumentation is a university with 13 faculties in Saint Petersburg, Russia. Faculties are devoted to innovation management, aerospace engineering, electronic engineering, energy development, computer science, telecommunication, humanities, military science, economics, jurisprudence and special faculties for distance education and recently acquired colleges.

University has several buildings and campuses, two of them located near to Chesme Church. Main building is located on the bank of the Moyka River, on the opposite bank of the river stands the building of Moika Palace. One campus of SUAI is situated in Ivangorod, near the border with Estonia.

There are students from many countries through international educational programs. Total quantity of students is more than 10 thousand.

Faculties

History

In 1941 the institute was founded as the "Leningrad Institute of Aviation".

In 1945 the institute was reorganized as the "Leningrad Institute of Aviation Instrumentation".

In 1992 the Leningrad Institute of Aerospace Instrumentation passed the state accreditation and has received a new status – Saint-Petersburg State Academy of Aerospace Instrumentation.

In 1998 the Saint-Petersburg State Academy of Aerospace Instrumentation passed the state accreditation and has received a new status – Saint-Petersburg State University of Aerospace Instrumentation (abbreviation SUAI).

In 2007 SUAI acquired two colleges, whose main specializations were computer science, automatics and electronics. They were united into new faculty in 2009. Both of them were established in 1930.

International Partners 
Worldwide
 International Society of Automation
 SPIE
 UNESCO
 CDIO Initiative
In Argentine
 Pontifical Catholic University of Argentina
In Belgium
 College of Europe
In Bulgaria
 Institute of Mathematics and Informatics (Bulgarian Academy of Sciences)
In Canada
 McMaster University
In China
 Beihang University
 Harbin Institute of Technology
 Nanjing University of Aeronautics and Astronautics
In Europe
 TEMPUS
In Finland and Russia
 FRUCT
 Turku Science Park
In France
 École supérieure d'ingénieurs en génie électrique
 École nationale supérieure de l'électronique et de ses applications (Cergy-Pontoise)
 École nationale supérieure d'ingénieurs de constructions aéronautiques
 École Nationale Supérieure de Mécanique et des Microtechniques
 INRIA
 Institut supérieur d'électronique de Paris
 Rouen Business School
 University of Bordeaux 1
 University of Franche-Comté
In Hungary
 Budapest University of Technology and Economics
In Germany
 Karlsruhe Institute of Technology
 University of Stuttgart
 University of Ulm
In Israel
 Ben-Gurion University of the Negev
In Italy
 University of Catania
 Roma Tre University
In Korea
 Keimyung University
In The Netherlands
 Eindhoven University of Technology
In Poland
 Szczecin University of Technology
In Russia
 Russian Federal Space Agency
 Moscow State Aviation Technological University
 Baltic State Technical University
 Kazan State Technical University named after A. N. Tupolev
 Moscow Aviation Institute
 Siberian State Aerospace University
 Ufa State Aviation Technical University
 Rybinsk State Aviation Technical University
 Samara State Aerospace University
 Ulyanovsk State University
In Spain
 Technical University of Madrid
 University of Valladolid
In Sweden
 Lund University
In Taiwan
 National Chiao Tung University
 Ching Yun University
In USA
 Indiana University
 Harrison College (Indiana)
 University of California, Riverside
 University of Maryland, College Park
 Suffolk University
and others,.

Plagiarism cases in University academical staff
Russian civic activity site dissernet.org has published an investigation which demonstrates a significant amount of plagiarism in the Doktor Nauk degree thesis of the current head of SUAI Prof. Antokhina.

Notable students and alumni
 Anatoly Glushenkov – first democratically elected Governor of Smolensk Oblast (1993–1998)
 Konstantin Khabensky – actor 
 Viktor Khryapa – bronze medalist of Summer Olympic Games 2012 
 Oleg Kuvaev – artist, designer and animator
 Andrey Moguchy – artistic director of Tovstonogov Bolshoi Drama Theater
 Georgy Poltavchenko – Governor of Saint Petersburg
 Viktor Rashchupkin – Olympic Champion of Summer Olympic Games 1980 
 Anatoly Roshchin – Olympic Champion of Summer Olympic Games 1972 
 Maria Semyonova –  writer
 Andrey Turchak – Governor of Pskov Oblast
 Alexander Vasilyev – musician (not ended)
 Natalia Vorobieva – Olympic Champion of Summer Olympic Games 2012

Famous faculty
 Yuri Vasilyevich Gulyayev – full Member of the USSR Academy of Sciences (1984–1991), the Russian Academy of Sciences (since 1991)
 Nikolay Nikolayevich Krasil'nikov – professor, winner of the Russian Federation Government Prize in Education (2009)

References

Educational institutions established in 1941
Aerospace engineering organizations
Engineering universities and colleges in Russia
Universities and institutes established in the Soviet Union
Universities in Saint Petersburg
1941 establishments in Russia
Aviation in the Soviet Union